The Pentax MZ-S is a 35mm single-lens reflex camera from Pentax of Japan.  It was introduced in 2001 
and discontinued in February 2006.  
It is closely related to the prototype MZ-D Full-frame digital SLR, which never entered production.
It was the top-of-the-line model of Pentax's MZ/ZX series and replaced the PZ-1p as the high-end Pentax camera. 
No camera was produced to replace the MZ-S, making it Pentax's last high-end 35 mm camera. The MZ-S is the last film camera from Pentax that was manufactured in Japan.

Design

The MZ-S was a "clean sheet of paper" design that re-thought most aspects of Pentax's camera interface and appearance.
Design goals included simpler operation, small size and light weight without sacrificing the sophisticated features required to be competitive.  The MZ-S design returned to a more conventional one compared to the PZ-1p; the shoe for external flash and accessories returned to the top of the pentaprism housing, instead of the unusual right-handgrip position used on the older camera.  The status LCD moved from atop the pentaprism to the top of the camera's right shoulder, like many competing designs.  However, instead of a flat camera top, the Pentax designers angled the top plate towards the user at a 30° angle for easier viewing.

The camera featured an autofocus system based on six linear CCD sensors, on-film data recording and an MTF autoexposure mode which chooses the aperture for maximum sharpness.

See also
 Pentax cameras

References

External links

  
  
 
 
 

MZ-S
135 film cameras
Pentax K-mount cameras